Southern Desert Correctional Center (SDCC) is a state prison for men located in Indian Springs, Clark County, Nevada, owned and operated by the Nevada Department of Corrections.  The capacity is 2149 inmates. Most are medium security.  

This facility should not be confused with the Southern Nevada Correctional Center, a state facility at Jean that closed in 2008, or the Nevada Southern Detention Center, a private prison at Pahrump run by Corrections Corporation of America under contract with the United States Marshals Service.

History

Southern Desert Correctional Center opened in February 1982 with seven 102-cell housing units, one of which housed federal prisoners until the NDOC took it over in 1987. A new 200-cell housing unit opened in 1989, and two 240-bed dormitory-style housing units were added in March 2008, bringing the population capacity from 714 in 1982 to its present capacity of 2,149.

On September 23rd, 2022, an inmate escaped from the facility. Porfirio Duarte-Herrera, one of the perpetrators of the 2007 Luxor bombing, used battery acid to weaken the window of his cell and created a dummy, possibly of cardboard, to fool the guards after exiting through it. His absence was not noticed for several days. Officers only found out he was missing after other inmates informed them of his absence. Duarte-Herrera was recaptured on September 28th at a bus stop in Las Vegas awaiting a bus to Tijuana, Mexico. Following this, Charles Daniels, the director of the NDOC, resigned at Governor Sisolak's request.

References

Prisons in Nevada
Buildings and structures in Clark County, Nevada
1982 establishments in Nevada
Indian Springs, Nevada